The 1940 Colorado gubernatorial election was held on November 5, 1940. Incumbent Republican Ralph Lawrence Carr defeated Democratic nominee George E. Saunders with 54.37% of the vote.

Primary elections
Primary elections were held on September 10, 1940.

Democratic primary

Candidates
George E. Saunders, Secretary of State of Colorado
John A. Carroll, District Attorney of Denver
George J. Knapp

Results

Republican primary

Candidates
Ralph Lawrence Carr, incumbent Governor

Results

General election

Candidates
Major party candidates
Ralph Lawrence Carr, Republican
George E. Saunders, Democratic

Other candidates
Carle Whitehead, Socialist
Laurence W. Coffman, Prohibition

Results

References

1940
Colorado
Gubernatorial